Christianoconcha quintalia is a species of small air-breathing land snails, terrestrial gastropod mollusks in the family Punctidae, the dot snails. This species is endemic to Norfolk Island, Australasia.

References

Gastropods of Norfolk Island
Christianoconcha
Vulnerable fauna of Australia
Gastropods described in 1945
Taxonomy articles created by Polbot